Américo Hoss (29 February 1914 in Budapest, Hungary - 20 October 1990 in Buenos Aires, Argentina) was a prolific Hungarian-Argentine cinematographer.

Hoss worked on over 90 films in his career between 1947 and 1980.

He died on October 20, 1990, in Buenos Aires, Argentina.

Filmography

 Los hijos del otro (1947)
 La cumparsita (1947)
 No me digas adiós  (1947)
 La dama del collar (1947)
 Las aventuras de Jack (1948)
 La barra de la esquina (1950)
 Campeón a la fuerza (1950)
 No me digas adiós (1950)
 El ladrón canta boleros (1950)
 Paraíso robado (1951)
 El hermoso Brummel (1951)
 Buenos Aires, mi tierra querida (1951)
 Volver a la vida (1951)
 Mi vida por la tuya (1951)
 Donde comienzan los pantanos (1952)
  (1953)
 Detective (1954)
 Casada y señorita (1954)
 La telaraña (1954)
 Se necesita un hombre con cara de infeliz (1954)
 El cartero (1954)
 La delatora (1955)
 Concierto para una lágrima (1955)
 En carne viva (1955)
 Ensayo final (1955)
 Pobre pero honrado (1955)
 Música, alegría y amor  (1955)
 ' (1956)
 Música, alegría y amor (1956)
 África ríe (1956)
 Luces de candilejas (1956)
 De noche también se duerme (1956)
 Spring of Life (1957)
 Sección desaparecidos (1958)
 Alto Paraná (1958)
 Socios para la aventura (1958)
 Una cita con la vida (1958)
 Las tierras blancas (1958)
 Mi esqueleto (1959)
 El candidato (1959)
 Salitre (1959)
 Culpable (1960)
 Obras maestras del terror (1960)
 Los asesinos las prefieren rubias  (1961)
 La maestra enamorada (1961)
 Tercer mundo (1961)
 Libertad bajo palabra (1961)
 Una americana en Buenos Aires (1961)
 El mago de las finanzas (1962)
 Cristóbal Colón en la Facultad de Medicina (1962)
 El noveno mandamiento (1962)
 Socia de alcoba (1962)
 Il mondo sulle spiaggie  (Documentary) (Italia) (1962)
 Carnaval del crimen  (1962)
 Canuto Cañete, conscripto del siete (1963)
 La calesita (1963)
 Cleopatra era Cándida (1964)
 La herencia (1964)
 El gordo Villanueva (1964)
 Circe (1964)
 Proceso a la ley (Inédita) (1964)
 Esquiú, una luz en el sendero (1965)
 Canuto Cañete, detective privado (1965)
 Nacidos para cantar (1965)
 Muchachos impacientes (1965)
 La pérgola de las flores (1965)
 El galleguito de la cara sucia (1966)
 ¡Cómo te extraño...!  o Quédate conmigo  (1966)(1966)
 La mujer de tu prójimo  (1966)
 La cigarra está que arde (1967)
 Tacuara y Chamorro, pichones de hombre (1967)
 Las pirañas (1967)
 Escándalo en la familia (1967)
 Humo de marihuana (1968)
 El día que me quieras (1969)
 El bulín (1969)
 En una playa junto al mar (1971)
 El caradura y la millonaria (1971)
 Las píldoras (1972)
 Fiebre (1972)
 Furia infernal (1973)
 Lucharon sin armas  (1973)
 Los caballeros de la cama redonda (1973)
 Los doctores las prefieren desnudas (1973)
 Rolando Rivas, taxista (1974)
 El sexo y el amor (1974)
 Intimidades de una cualquiera (1974)
 Carmiña (Su historia de amor)  (1975)
 Solamente ella (1975)
 Un mundo de amor (1975)
 Embrujada (1976)
 Una mariposa en la noche (1977)
 Las aventuras de Pikín (1977)
 El divorcio está de moda (de común acuerdo) (1978)
 El último amor en Tierra del Fuego (1979)
 Alejandra, mon amour  (1979)
 Insaciable (1979)
 No apto para menores (1979)
 El diablo metió la pata (1980)
 Operación Comando'' (1980)

External links
 

1914 births
1990 deaths
Argentine cinematographers
Hungarian cinematographers
Hungarian emigrants to Argentina
Naturalized citizens of Argentina
Film people from Budapest